The Edel Live is a South Korean single-place, paraglider that was designed and produced by Edel Paragliders of Gwangju. It is now out of production.

Design and development
The Live was designed as an intermediate glider. The models are each named for their relative size.

Operational history
In a 2003 review Reviewer Noel Bertrand reported that Live has proven very commercially successful.

Variants
Live S
Small-sized model for light-weight pilots. The glider model is DHV 1-2 certified.
Live M
Mid-sized model for medium-weight pilots. The glider model is DHV 1-2 certified.
Live L
Large-sized model for heavier pilots. The glider model is DHV 1-2 certified.

Specifications (Live M)

References

Live
Paragliders